The Kolbe nitrile synthesis is a method for the preparation of alkyl nitriles by reaction of the corresponding alkyl halide with a metal cyanide. A side product for this reaction is the formation of an isonitrile because the cyanide ion is an ambident nucleophile and according to Kornblum's rule is capable of reacting with either carbon or nitrogen. The reaction is named after Hermann Kolbe.

\underset{alkyl\ halide}{R-X} + \underset{cyanide\ ion}{CN^\ominus} -> \underset{alkyl\ nitrile}{R-C{\equiv}N} + \underset{alkyl\ isonitrile}{R-\overset\oplus N{\equiv}C^\ominus}

The ratio in which both isomers form depends on the solvent and the reaction mechanism. With the application of alkali cyanides such as sodium cyanide and polar solvents the reaction type is an SN2 reaction whereby the alkylhalide is attacked by the more nucleophilic carbon atom of the cyanide ion. This type of reaction together with dimethyl sulfoxide as a solvent is a convenient method for the synthesis of nitriles. The use of DMSO was a major advancement in the development of this reaction, as it works for more sterically hindered electrophilies (secondary and neopentyl halides) without rearrangement side-reactions.

See also
Rosenmund–von Braun reaction, a similar reaction for the synthesis of aromatic nitriles

References

Substitution reactions
Name reactions